Jukka Vilander (born 27 November 1962) is a former professional Finnish ice hockey forward. He is a four time Finnish champion with HC TPS (1989, 1990, 1991, 1993) and is 1996 Danish Champion with EfB Ishockey. He has made SM-liiga All-Star Team in 1988–89 season. Vilander has represented Finland men's national ice hockey team in three Ice Hockey World Championships.

Honours and accolades
Won the Danish Champion in 1995–96.
Won the Finnish Champion (Kanada-malja) in 1988–89, 1989–90, 1990–91 and 1992–93.
SM-Liiga Runners-up in 1981–82, 1984–85 and 1993–94.
Raimo Kilpiö trophy in 1987, 1988 and 1989.
Aarne Honkavaara trophy in 1989.
Kultainen kypärä in 1989.
Matti Keinonen trophy in 1989.
IIHF European Cup trophy in 1993.
IIHF European Cup Runners-up in 1989–90,
Vilander played as the Finland national team for the 3 times in World Championships, 1986, 1989 and 1990.

Career statistics

Regular season and playoffs

International

External links 

1962 births
Finnish ice hockey forwards
Living people
People from Naantali
HC TPS players
Finnish expatriate ice hockey players in Denmark
Sportspeople from Southwest Finland